An earthquake struck near Misca, Peru at . The shock had a moment magnitude of 5.0 and a maximum Mercalli intensity of VII (Very strong). The focal mechanism displayed primarily normal motion with a small left-lateral component. The event resulted in the deaths of 8 people and damaged or destroyed 60 homes in the region, with rock slides and power failures affecting the epicentral area.

Misca, a remote Andean village, was most affected by the quake. The small village experienced the collapse of around 45 homes. Four children and four adults were killed according to emergency workers.
The president of Peru, President Ollanta Humala added that Misca, which was also 90% damaged, had been erected directly on a geological fault line and should be rebuilt in a different location after proper  geographical survey of the area.

See also
 List of earthquakes in 2014
 List of earthquakes in Peru

References

External links
 M4.9 - 19km SW of Urcos, Peru – United States Geological Survey
 Earthquake killed 8 in Peru – Reuters
Earthquake in southern Peru destroys 90 percent of remote Andean village; 8 dead-UPI
 

2014 earthquakes
2014 in Peru
Earthquakes in Peru
2014 disasters in Peru